The 1963 AFC Youth Championship was held in the Federation of Malaya.

Teams
The following teams entered the tournament:

 
 
 
 
 
 
  (host)

Group stage

Group A

Group B

Third place match

Final

External links
Results by RSSSF

AFC U-19 Championship
1963 in Malaysian sport
1963 in Asian football
International association football competitions hosted by Malaysia
1963 in youth association football